Figure skating at the 2013 European Youth Olympic Winter Festival took place at the Poiana Brașov Ice Rink in Poiana Brașov, Romania between February 17 and 22, 2013. Skaters competed in the disciplines of men's singles and ladies' singles.

Medal summary

Medalists

Medal table

Results

Men

Ladies

References

External links
 Results
 The Venue at EYOWF 2013 | Photo Gallery
 EYOWF 2013 - Presentation Video at YouTube
 EYOWF 2013 - Facilities Presentation at YouTube

2013 in figure skating
2013 European Youth Olympic Winter Festival events
2013
2013 EYOF